The Copa de Su Majestad La Reina de Fútbol was the 24th edition of Spain's women's football national cup, running from May 7 to June 11, 2006. The final took place in Valencia, in Levante UD's ground, and confronted Superliga champion RCD Espanyol and underdog SD Lagunak, which had qualified because Estudiantes folded following the end of the Superliga campaign. Espanyol won its third cup and followed the steps of Atlético Málaga, CD Oroquieta and Levante UD to win the double by beating Lagunak on penalties after a 2–2 draw. It was the second edition that was won through a penalty shootout, 21 years later.

Qualification

Teams by autonomous community

Results

Quarter-finals

|}

Semifinals

|}

Final

References

Copa de la Reina
Women
2005-06